Kosmos 165 ( meaning Cosmos 165), also known as DS-P1-Yu No.11 was a radar calibration target satellite which was used by the Soviet Union for tests of anti-ballistic missiles. It was a  spacecraft, which was built by the Yuzhnoye Design Office, and launched in 1967 as part of the Dnepropetrovsk Sputnik programme.

Kosmos 165 was launched using a Kosmos-2I 63SM carrier rocket, which flew from Site 133/3 at Plesetsk Cosmodrome. The launch occurred at 18:06:00 GMT on 12 June 1967.

It decayed from orbit on 15 January 1968. Kosmos 165 was the eighth of seventy nine DS-P1-Yu satellites to be launched, and the seventh of seventy two to successfully reach orbit.

See also

 1967 in spaceflight

References

Spacecraft launched in 1967
Kosmos 0165
1967 in the Soviet Union
Dnepropetrovsk Sputnik program